Buffy the Vampire Slayer is an ongoing comic book series published by Boom! Studios.  It is a reboot of the television series Buffy the Vampire Slayer created by Joss Whedon, and thus sets in a different canon from the television series'. The series is written by Jordie Bellaire and primarily illustrated by Dan Mora.

Plot
High school student Buffy Summers has recently moved to the small town of Sunnydale, California with her mother Joyce and Joyce’s doctor boyfriend Eric.  Secretly, Buffy is in fact a Vampire Slayer, chosen to battle supernatural forces of evil, and undergoes training by her Watcher and school librarian Rupert Giles.  Three weeks after arriving in Sunnydale, Buffy accidentally blows her cover saving Willow Rosenberg and Xander Harris from a vampire outside Tunaverse, the fast food restaurant where she works part-time.  Giles is disappointed in her lack of discretion, but Willow and Xander prove to be reliable allies when they aid Buffy in battle against the new vampires in town, Spike and his Mistress Drusilla.

In their own time, Willow runs for school president with support from her girlfriend Rose and Xander blogs about his loneliness and insecurities under the pseudonym @theXeppo.  Their classmates at Sunnydale High include Cordelia Chase, Willow’s excessively friendly competition for school president who meets Spike when he helps recover her campaign balloons, and the athletic Robin Wood, who strikes up a flirtatious relationship with Buffy. Meanwhile, the centuries-old Anya runs a local occult shop, remaining neutral in the battle between good and evil but attracting attention from Drusilla.

Development
Instead of continuing the narrative from where Dark Horse left off, Boom! Studios reboots the series entirely.  Executive editor Jeanine Schaefer explained that this decision was made because the existing Buffyverse was such a "richly developed" narrative already. According to Schaefer, "Dark Horse did such a great job with the book [...] and they were really able to not only explore every corner of the Buffy universe, but also took her so far as a person and took her relationships so far. So as we were thinking about it, it feels really closed. It feels like they brought her to such a great point." Instead, Boom! Studios intended to reimagine Buffy for modern day readers, believing that the themes and character arcs of the original series were still relevant to young people in 2019. Schaefer elaborated, "The world right now is scarier than it’s ever been; placing these characters firmly in 2019, we can use the themes that were so integral to the show -- identity, agency, and empathy -- to examine our world and the heroes and monsters that lurk inside all of us...and punch those monsters right in the face."

The series has drawn comparison to the Ultimate Marvel comic book imprint, which reimagined decades-old Marvel Comics superheroes for modern audiences in the 21st century.

Publication

Single issues

References

External links
•	Buffy – BOOM! Studios

Horror comics
LGBT-related comics
2019 in comics
Comic book reboots